The 2019–20 BC Zenit Saint Petersburg season will be the 17th season in the existence of the club and its 6th season as the team entitled Zenit. The club will play in the VTB United League and EuroLeague.

It will be the second season under head coach Joan Plaza. On 27 June 2019, EuroLeague Basketball announced it awarded Zenit a wild card for the 2019–20 EuroLeague. This season therefore marks Zenit's debut in the highest European tier.

To participate in the tournament, the roster of Zenit was mostly changed - not only foreign but also Russian experienced players left the team: Andrey Desyatnikov, Evgeny Valiev and Sergey Karasev moved to Khimki. They were changed by also experienced players from other Russian clubs: Andrey Zubkov (from Khimki), Anton Ponkrashov (from UNICS Kazan), Dmitry Khvostov and Mateusz Ponitka (both - from Lokomotiv Kuban) and some players from foreign leagues: Andrew Albicy (from Andorra), Alex Renfroe (from Partizan Belgrade), 	Austin Hollins (from Rasta Vechta), Gustavo Ayón (from Real Madrid), Will Thomas (from Valencia), Colton Iverson and Tim Abromaitis (both - from Iberostar Tenerife).

Players

Squad information

Depth chart

Transactions

In

Out

Pre-seasons and friendlies

Matches

Competitions

Overview

VTB United League

League table

Matches

References

External links
 Official website

Zenit
Zenit
Zenit